Minuscule 405 (in the Gregory-Aland numbering), ε 1012 (in Soden's numbering), is a Greek minuscule manuscript of the New Testament, on parchment. Palaeographically it has been assigned to the 10th century.
It has marginalia.

Description 

The codex contains the text of the four Gospels on 223 parchment leaves with some lacunae (Matthew 1:1-17; John 6:55-9:13; 11:30-45; 18:20-36). The text is written in one column per page, in 22 lines per page.

There is also a division according to the Ammonian Sections (Mark 233 Sections, the last in 16:8), with references to the Eusebian Canons (written below Ammonian Section numbers).

Text 

The Greek text of the codex is a representative of the Byzantine text-type. Hermann von Soden classified it to the textual family Kx. Aland placed it in Category V.
According to the Claremont Profile Method it has a mixture of the Byzantine text-families in Luke 1, in Luke 20 it represents Kx. In Luke 10 no profile was made.

History 

Formerly the manuscript was held in the monastery of St. Cosmae et Damiani in Brusa of Prussia. Wiedmann and Braun collated portions of the manuscript for Scholz. The manuscript was added to the list of New Testament manuscripts by Scholz (1794-1852).
C. R. Gregory saw it in 1886.

The manuscript is currently housed at the Biblioteca Marciana (Gr. I. 10) in Venice.

See also 

 List of New Testament minuscules
 Biblical manuscript
 Textual criticism

References

Further reading 

 

Greek New Testament minuscules
10th-century biblical manuscripts